The Babington Plot was a plan in 1586 to assassinate Queen Elizabeth I, a Protestant, and put Mary, Queen of Scots, her Catholic cousin, on the English throne. It led to Mary's execution, a result of a letter sent by Mary (who had been imprisoned for 19 years since 1568 in England at the behest of Elizabeth) in which she consented to the assassination of Elizabeth.

The long-term goal of the plot was the invasion of England by the Spanish forces of King Philip II and the Catholic League in France, leading to the restoration of the old religion. The plot was discovered by Elizabeth's spymaster Sir Francis Walsingham and used to entrap Mary for the purpose of removing her as a claimant to the English throne.

The chief conspirators were Anthony Babington and John Ballard. Babington, a young recusant, was recruited by Ballard, a Jesuit priest who hoped to rescue the Scottish Queen. Working for Walsingham were double agents Robert Poley and Gilbert Gifford, as well as Thomas Phelippes, a spy agent and cryptanalyst, and the puritan spy Maliverey Catilyn. The turbulent Catholic deacon Gifford had been in Walsingham's service since the end of 1585 or the beginning of 1586. Gifford obtained a letter of introduction to Queen Mary from a confidant and spy for her, Thomas Morgan. Walsingham then placed double agent Gifford and spy decipherer Phelippes inside Chartley Castle, where Queen Mary was imprisoned. Gifford organised the Walsingham plan to place Babington's and Queen Mary's encrypted communications into a beer barrel cork which were then intercepted by Phelippes, decoded and sent to Walsingham.

On 7 July 1586, the only Babington letter that was sent to Mary was decoded by Phelippes. Mary responded in code on 17 July 1586 ordering the would-be rescuers to assassinate Queen Elizabeth. The response letter also included deciphered phrases indicating her desire to be rescued: "The affairs being thus prepared" and "I may suddenly be transported out of this place". At the Fotheringay trial in October 1586, Elizabeth's Lord High Treasurer William Cecil - Lord Burghley - and Walsingham used the letter against Mary who refused to admit that she was guilty. But she was betrayed by her secretaries Nau and Curle who confessed under pressure that the letter was mainly truthful.

Mary's imprisonment

Mary, Queen of Scots, a Roman Catholic, was regarded by Roman Catholics as the legitimate heir to the throne of England. In 1568 she escaped imprisonment by Scottish rebels and sought the aid of her first cousin once removed, Queen Elizabeth I, a year after her forced abdication from the throne of Scotland. The issuance of the papal bull Regnans in Excelsis by Pope Pius V on 25 February 1570, granted English Catholics authority to overthrow the English queen. Queen Mary became the focal point of numerous plots and intrigues to restore England to its former religion, Catholicism, and to depose Elizabeth and even to take her life. Rather than the expected aid, Elizabeth imprisoned Mary for nineteen years in the charge of a succession of jailers, principally the Earl of Shrewsbury.

In 1584 Elizabeth's Privy Council signed a "Bond of Association" designed by Cecil and Walsingham which stated that anyone within the line of succession to the throne on whose behalf anyone plotted against the Queen, would be excluded from the line and executed. This was agreed upon by hundreds of Englishmen, who likewise signed the Bond. Mary also agreed to sign the Bond. The following year, Parliament passed the Act of Association, which provided for the execution of anyone who would benefit from the death of the Queen if a plot against her was discovered. Because of the bond, Mary could be executed if a plot was initiated by others that could lead to her accession to England's throne.

Queen Elizabeth ordered Queen Mary transferred back to the ruined Tutbury Castle in the wintry weather of Christmas Eve 1569. Mary became ill because of the bad conditions of her captivity, imprisoned in a very damp cold room with closed windows and with no access to the sun.

In 1585, Elizabeth ordered Mary to be transferred in a coach and under heavy guard and placed under the strictest confinement at Chartley Hall in Staffordshire, under the control of Sir Amias Paulet. She was prohibited any correspondence with the outside world. Puritan Paulet was chosen by Queen Elizabeth in part because he abhorred Queen Mary's Catholic faith.

Reacting to the growing threat posed by Catholics, urged on by the pope and other Catholic monarchs in Europe, Francis Walsingham, Queen Elizabeth's Secretary of State and spymaster, together with William Cecil, Elizabeth's chief advisor, realised that if Mary could be implicated in a plot to assassinate Elizabeth, she could be executed and the papist threat diminished. As he wrote to the Earl of Leicester: "So long as that devilish woman lives, neither Her Majesty must make account to continue in quiet possession of her crown, nor her faithful servants assure themselves of safety of their lives."
Walsingham used Babington to ensnare Queen Mary by sending his double agent, Gilbert Gifford to Paris to obtain the confidence of Morgan, then locked in the Bastille. Morgan previously worked for George Talbot, 6th Earl of Shrewsbury, an earlier jailor of Queen Mary. Through Shrewsbury, Queen Mary became acquainted with Morgan. Queen Mary sent Morgan to Paris to deliver letters to the French court. While in Paris, Morgan became involved in a previous plot designed by William Parry, which resulted in Morgan's incarceration in the Bastille. In 1585 Gifford was arrested returning to England while coming through Rye in Sussex with letters of introduction from Morgan to Queen Mary. Walsingham released Gifford to work as a double agent, in the Babington Plot. Gifford used the alias "No. 4" just as he had used other aliases such as Colerdin, Pietro and Cornelys. Walsingham had Gifford function as a courier in the entrapment plot against Queen Mary.

Plot
The Babington plot was related to several separate plans:
solicitation of a Spanish invasion of England with the purpose of deposing Protestant Queen Elizabeth and replacing her with Catholic Queen Mary;
a plot to assassinate Queen Elizabeth.

At the behest of Mary's French supporters, John Ballard, a Jesuit priest and agent of the Roman Church, went to England on various occasions in 1585 to secure promises of aid from the northern Catholic gentry on behalf of Mary. In March 1586, he met with John Savage, an ex-soldier who was involved in a separate plot against Elizabeth and who had sworn an oath to assassinate the queen. He was resolved in this plot after consulting with three friends: Dr. William Gifford, Christopher Hodgson and Gilbert Gifford. Gilbert Gifford had been arrested by Walsingham and agreed to be a double agent. Gifford was already in Walsingham's employ by the time Savage was going ahead with the plot, according to Conyers Read. Later that same year, Gifford reported to Charles Paget and Don Bernardino de Mendoza, and told them that English Catholics were prepared to mount an insurrection against Elizabeth, provided that they would be assured of foreign support. While it was uncertain whether Ballard's report of the extent of Catholic opposition was accurate, what was certain is that he was able to secure assurances that support would be forthcoming. He then returned to England, where he persuaded a member of the Catholic gentry, Anthony Babington, to lead and organise the English Catholics against Elizabeth. Ballard informed Babington about the plans that had been so far proposed. Babington's later confession made it clear that Ballard was sure of the support of the Catholic League:

Despite this assurance of this foreign support, Babington was hesitant, as he thought that no foreign invasion would succeed for as long as Elizabeth remained, to which Ballard answered that the plans of John Savage would take care of that. After a lengthy discussion with friends and soon-to-be fellow conspirators, Babington consented to join and to lead the conspiracy.

Unfortunately for the conspirators, Walsingham was certainly aware of some of the aspects of the plot, based on reports by his spies, most notably Gilbert Gifford, who kept tabs on all the major participants. While he could have shut down some part of the plot and arrested some of those involved within reach, he still lacked any piece of evidence that would prove Queen Mary's active participation in the plot and he feared to commit any mistake which might cost Elizabeth her life.

Infiltration

After the Throckmorton Plot, Queen Elizabeth had issued a decree in July 1584, which prevented all communication to and from Mary. However, Walsingham and Cecil realised that that decree also impaired their ability to entrap Mary. They needed evidence for which she could be executed based on their Bond of Association tenets. Thus Walsingham established a new line of communication, one which he could carefully control without incurring any suspicion from Mary. Gifford approached the French ambassador to England, Guillaume de l'Aubespine, Baron de Châteauneuf-sur-Cher, and described the new correspondence arrangement that had been designed by Walsingham. Gifford and jailer Paulet had arranged for a local brewer to facilitate the movement of messages between Queen Mary and her supporters by placing them in a watertight casing inside the stopper of a beer barrel. Thomas Phelippes, a cipher and language expert in Walsingham's employ, was then quartered at Chartley Hall to receive the messages, decode them and send them to Walsingham. Gifford submitted a code table (supplied by Walsingham) to Chateauneuf and requested the first message be sent to Mary.

All subsequent messages to Mary would be sent via diplomatic packets to Chateauneuf, who then passed them on to Gifford. Gifford would pass them on to Walsingham, who would confide them to Phelippes. The cipher used was a nomenclator cipher. Phelippes would decode and make a copy of the letter. The letter was then resealed and given back to Gifford, who would pass it on to the brewer. The brewer would then smuggle the letter to Mary. If Mary sent a letter to her supporters, it would go through the reverse process. In short order, every message coming to and from Chartley Hall was intercepted and read by Walsingham.

Correspondence

This letter was received by Mary on 14 July 1586, who was in a dark mood knowing that her son had betrayed her in favour of Elizabeth, and three days later she replied to Babington in a long letter in which she outlined the components of a successful rescue and the need to assassinate Elizabeth. She also stressed the necessity of foreign aid if the rescue attempt was to succeed:

Mary, in her response letter, advised the would-be rescuers to confront the Puritans and to link her case to the Queen of England as her heir.

Mary was clear in her support for the murder of Elizabeth if that would have led to her liberty and Catholic domination of England. In addition, Queen Mary supported in that letter, and in another one to Ambassador Mendoza, a Spanish invasion of England.

The letter was again intercepted and deciphered by Phelippes. But this time, Phelippes, on the direction of Walsingham, kept the original and made a copy, adding a request for the names of the conspirators:

Then, a letter was sent that would destroy Mary's life.

Arrests, trials and executions

John Ballard was arrested on 4 August 1586, and under torture he confessed and implicated Babington. Although Babington was able to receive the letter with the postscript, he was not able to reply with the names of the conspirators, as he was arrested. Others were taken prisoner by 15 August 1586. Mary's two secretaries, Claude Nau and Gilbert Curle, and a clerk Jérôme Pasquier were likewise taken into custody and interrogated.

The conspirators were sentenced to death for treason and conspiracy against the crown, and were to be hanged, drawn, and quartered. This first group included Babington, Ballard, Chidiock Tichborne, Thomas Salisbury, Henry Donn, Robert Barnewell and John Savage. A further group of seven men including Edward Habington, Charles Tilney, Edward Jones, John Charnock, John Travers, Jerome Bellamy, and Robert Gage, were tried and convicted shortly afterward. Ballard and Babington were executed on 20 September 1586 along with the other men who had been tried with them. Such was the public outcry at the horror of their execution that Elizabeth changed the order for the second group to be allowed to hang until "quite dead" before disembowelling and quartering.

In October 1586 Mary was sent to be tried at Fotheringhay Castle in Northamptonshire by 46 English lords, bishops and earls. She was not permitted legal counsel, not permitted to review the evidence against her, nor to call witnesses. Portions of Phellipes' letter translations were read at the trial. Mary was convicted of treason against England. One English Lord voted not guilty. Elizabeth signed her cousin-once-removed's death warrant, and on 8 February 1587, in front of 300 witnesses, Mary, Queen of Scots, was executed by beheading.

In literature
Mary Stuart, a dramatised version of the last days of Mary, Queen of Scots, including the Babington Plot, was written by Friedrich Schiller and performed in Weimar, Germany, in 1800. This in turn formed the basis for Maria Stuarda, an opera by Donizetti, in 1835. Although the Babington Plot occurs before the events of the opera, and is only referenced twice during the opera, the second such occasion being Mary admitting her own part in it in private to her confessor (a role taken by Lord Talbot in the opera, although not in real life).

The story of the Babington Plot is dramatised in the novel Conies in the Hay by Jane Lane, and features prominently in Anthony Burgess's A Dead Man in Deptford. A fictional account is given in the My Story book series, The Queen's Spies (retitled To Kill A Queen 2008) told in diary format by a fictional Elizabethan girl, Kitty.
The Babington plot forms the historical background – and provides much of the intrigue – for Holy Spy, the 7th in the historical detective series by Rory Clements, featuring John Shakespeare, an intelligencer for Walsingham and elder brother of the more famous Will.

The simplified version of the Babington plot is also the subject of the children's or Young Adult novel, A Traveller in Time (1939), by Alison Uttley, who grew up near the Babington family home in Derbyshire. A young modern girl finds that she slips back to the time shortly before the Plot is about to be implemented. This was later made into a BBC TV mini-series in 1978, with small changes to the original novel.

The Babington Plot is also dramatized in the 2017 Ken Follett novel A Column of Fire, in Jacopo della Quercia's 2015 novel License to Quill, and in SJ Parris’s 2020 novel Execution, the latest of her novels featuring Giordano Bruno as protagonist.

The plot figures prominently in the first chapter of The Code Book, a survey of the history of cryptography written by Simon Singh and published in 1999.

Dramatic adaptations
Episode four of the television series Elizabeth R (titled "Horrible Conspiracies") is devoted to the Babington Plot, and the movie Elizabeth: The Golden Age deals with it as well.

A 45-minute drama entitled The Babington Plot, written by Michael Butt and directed by Sasha Yevtushenko, was broadcast on BBC Radio 4 on 2 December 2008 as part of the Afternoon Drama. This drama took the form of a documentary on the first anniversary of the executions, with the story being told from the perspectives of Thomas Salisbury, Robert Poley, Gilbert Gifford and others who, while not conspirators, are in some way connected with the events, all of whom are interviewed by the Presenter (played by Stephen Greif). The cast also included Samuel Barnett as Thomas Salisbury, Burn Gorman as Robert Poley, Jonathan Taffler as Thomas Phelippes and Inam Mirza as Gilbert Gifford.

Episode One of the 2017 BBC miniseries  Elizabeth I's Secret Agents (broadcast in the U.S. on PBS in 2018 as Queen Elizabeth's Secret Agents) deals in part with the Babington plot.

See also
Rising of the North
Ridolfi Plot
Throckmorton Plot
History of cryptography

Notes and references

Further reading
Gordon-Smith, Alan. The Babington Plot.  London: Macmillan (1936)
Guy, John A. Queen of Scots: The True Life of Mary Stuart (2005)
Lewis, Jayne Elizabeth. The trial of Mary Queen of Scots: a brief history with documents (1999)
Pollen, John Hungerford. "Mary Queen of Scots and the Babington plot," The Month, Volume 109 online (April 1907) pp. 356–365
Read, Conyers. Mr Secretary Walsingham and the policy of Queen Elizabeth 3 vols. (1925)
Shepherd, J.E.C. The Babington Plot: Jesuit Intrigue in Elizabethan England. Toronto, Ont.: Wittenburg Publications, 1987. 171 pp. 
Williams, Penry. "Babington, Anthony (1561–1586)", Oxford Dictionary of National Biography (2004) accessed 18 Sept 2011
Military Heritage August 2005, Volume 7, No. 1, pp. 20–23, .
Briscoe, Alexsandra, "Elizabeth's Spy Network", BBC History online (17 February 2011)

Primary sources
Pollen, John Hungerford, ed. "Mary Queen of Scots and the Babington Plot," Scottish Historical Society 3rd ser., iii (1922), reprints the major documents.

External links
Camden's Account of the Babington Plot
Portraits of Babington Plotters at their Execution and Ballad Describing their Ordeal
Babington Plot at UK National Archives

1586 in England
1586 in Scotland
Espionage scandals and incidents
History of cryptography
History of Catholicism in England
History of Catholicism in Scotland
Elizabeth I
Mary, Queen of Scots
Coup d'état attempts in Europe
1586 in Christianity
16th-century anti-Protestantism
16th-century coups d'état and coup attempts